= Lucha del garrote =

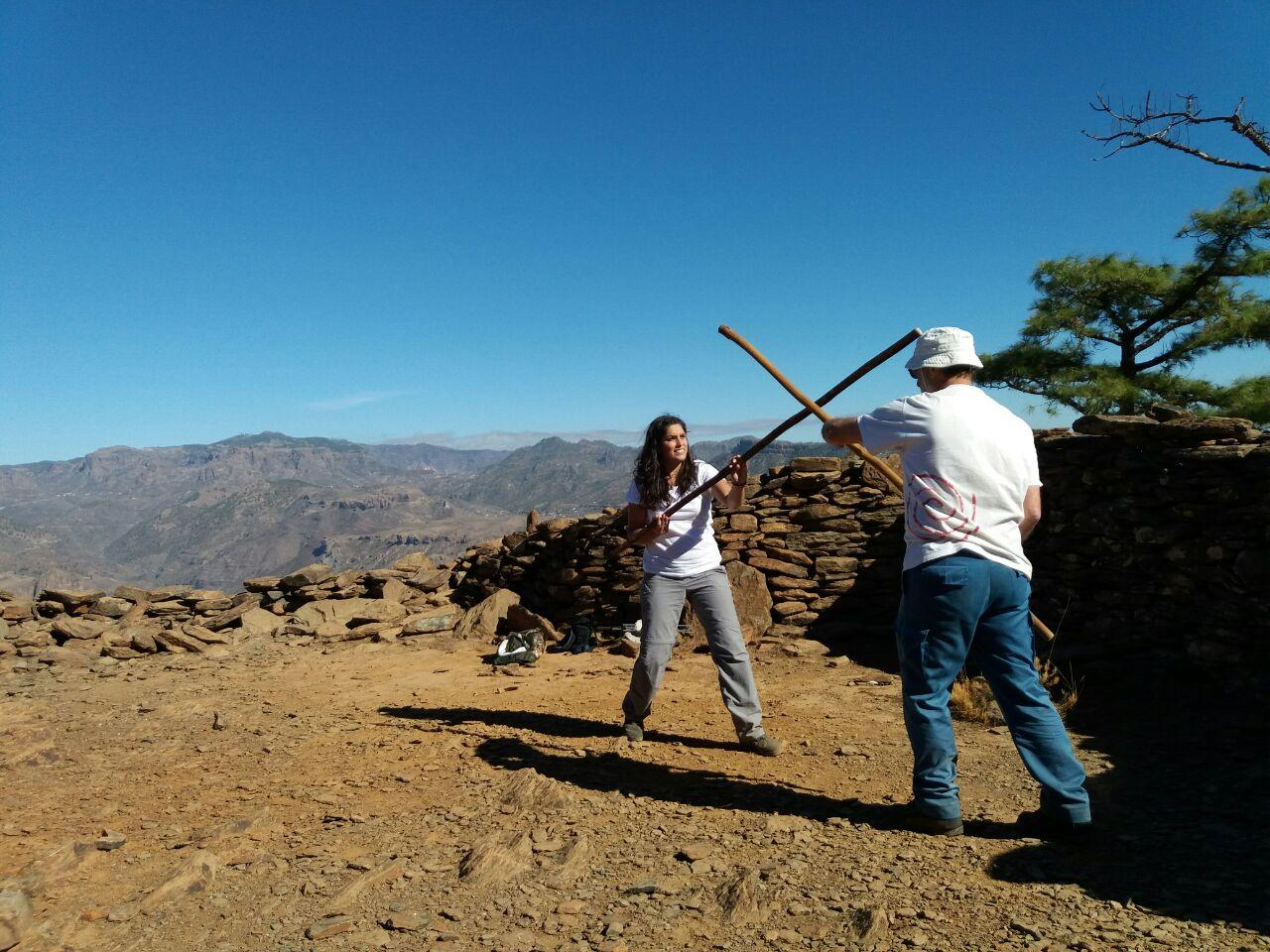
The fight stick is a spectacular folk practised throughout the Canary Islands.

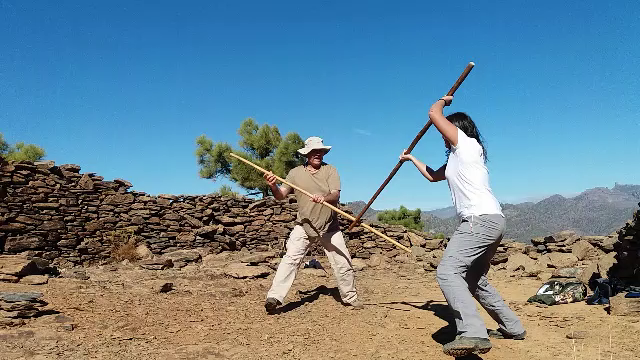
La lucha del garrote es una espectacular costumbre practicada en las Islas Canarias.

The fight stick (Spanish: Lucha del garrote) is a folk sport practised throughout the Canary Islands.

== History ==
The origins of lucha del garrote may date back to the aboriginal inhabitants of the islands prior to the Castilian conquest period of the early 15th century.

*"fuertemente a tirar piedras contra los cristianos, y a darles palos. strong to launch stones to Christian, and punch whit sticks. "

*"todos los demas canarioss que iban en su seguimiento tirando muchnas piedras y dardos y palos ...all another canarios going to persecute to launch many stones darts and sticks. "

*"sólo se defendían con piedras y con palos. they only defense whit stones and sticks."

*"pelearon por mas de tres horas viniendo unos y volviendo otros, estrecharonse con fuertes palos y varas de punta del palo mui recias y tostadas. they fight more than trhee hours go some and back another, confront whit stongs sticks and canes fats and toasteds "
